Mount Emmons is an unincorporated community in Duchesne County, Utah, United States.

References

Unincorporated communities in Duchesne County, Utah
Unincorporated communities in Utah